The 2018–19 Fairfield Stags men's basketball team represented Fairfield University in the 2018–19 NCAA Division I men's basketball season. They played their home games at Webster Bank Arena in Bridgeport, Connecticut and Alumni Hall in Fairfield, Connecticut as members of the Metro Atlantic Athletic Conference, and were led by eighth year head coach Sydney Johnson. They finished the 2018–19 season 9–22 overall, 6–12 in MAAC play to finish in a three-way tie for ninth place. As the 10th seed in the 2019 MAAC tournament, they were defeated by No. 7 seed Manhattan in the first round 53–57.

On March 11, 2019, head coach Sydney Johnson was fired. He finished at Fairfield with an eight-year record of 116–147.

Previous season
The Stags finished the 2017–18 season 17–16, 9–9 in MAAC play to finish in a tie for fifth place. As the No. 6 seed at the MAAC tournament, they defeated No. 11 seed Marist, upset No. 3 seed Niagara and No. 7 seed Quinnipiac to advance to the championship game, where they lost to Iona.

Roster

Schedule and results

|-
!colspan=12 style=| Non-Conference Regular season

|-
!colspan=9 style=| MAAC regular season

|-
!colspan=12 style=| MAAC tournament
|-

|-

Source

References

Fairfield Stags men's basketball seasons
Fairfield Stags
Fairfield Stags men's basketball team
Fairfield Stags men's basketball team